The Journal of Environmental Engineering is a monthly engineering journal published by the American Society of Civil Engineers. 

The main editor is Dionysios D. Dionysiou of University of Cincinnati.

The journal presents broad interdisciplinary information on the practice and status of research in environmental engineering science, systems engineering, and sanitation. Papers focus on engineering methods; impacts of wastewater collection and treatment; watershed contamination; environmental biology; nonpoint-source pollution on watersheds; air pollution and acid deposition; and solid waste management.

History
As one of ASCE's flagship journals which began publication in 1956, this journal's origin goes back to the publication of the first volume of Transactions of the American Society of Civil Engineers in 1892. Established originally as Journal of the Sanitary Engineering Division and renamed Journal of the Environmental Engineering Division in 1973, it acquired its current name in 1983.

Indexes
The journal is indexed in Google Scholar, Baidu, Elsevier (Ei Compendex), Clarivate Analytics (Web of Science), ProQuest, Civil engineering database, TRDI, OCLC (WorldCat), IET/INSPEC, Crossref, Scopus, and EBSCOHost.

References

External links 

 ASCE Library

Engineering journals
Environmental engineering
Sewerage
Systems engineering
Systems journals
Waste management journals
American Society of Civil Engineers academic journals
Publications established in 1956